is a 1961 Japanese satirical comedy directed by Masahiro Shinoda.

Plot
When a band of assassins come after a young journalist (played by Shima Iwashita) she turns to another assassin (Yûsuke Kawazu) for help.

References

External links
 
 My Face Red in the Sunset at MovieWeb
 

Japanese comedy films
1961 films
Cockfighting in film
1960s Japanese films
Japanese satirical films